CyanWorlds.com Engine (formerly Plasma) is a real-time 3D game engine originally called Headspin and developed by Headspin Technologies in 1997 and later by Cyan Worlds (Cyan purchased the engine as part of the acquisition of Headspin) to power the next generation of real time 3D Myst series games such as URU: Complete Chronicles and Myst V: End of Ages.

Cyan Worlds and OpenUru.org Foundry jointly announce open source delivery of the "CyanWorlds.com Engine" client and 3ds Max plugin, aka Plasma engine 2.0, the engine used to power Myst Online: Uru Live.

In 2014, Cyan released "realMyst: Masterpiece Edition", a remake version of realMyst, using Unity game engine instead of Plasma game engine.

Games using Plasma Engine

Plasma 1.0
realMyst (2000)

Plasma 2.0 (aka CyanWorlds.com Engine)
Uru: Ages Beyond Myst (2003)
Uru: To D'ni (2004)
Uru: The Path of the Shell (2004)
Myst Online: Uru Live (2007)
MagiQuest Online (2010)

Plasma 2.1
Crowthistle Chronicles: The Well of Tears (interactive CD) (2005).
Myst V: End of Ages (2005)

Plasma 3.0
Cosmic Osmo's Hex Isle (2007)

References

2000 software
Video game engines